George Iwao Fujimoto (born July 1, 1920) is an American chemist of Japanese descent. During his studies at Harvard his family was imprisoned in an American internment camp Minidoka in Idaho.  He discovered the Fujimoto-Belleau reaction, which is named after him and Bernard Belleau. He was widowed at the age of 99 when his wife Mary died in December 2019.

References
Harvard Crimson George Fujimoto

1920 births
Living people
21st-century American chemists
American academics of Japanese descent
American centenarians
Men centenarians
Harvard University alumni
Harvard University faculty
University of Michigan alumni
University of Utah faculty